The first Government of Prime Minister Aleksandër Meksi also known as "The First Democratic Government", is the 54th Government of the Republic of Albania formed on 19 April 1992, following the early elections of the same year when the Democratic Party led by Sali Berisha managed to win a majority of 92 seats out of 140 in the Parliament. The new government led by Meksi was approved in parliament on 13 April 1992, and took oath on 19 of the same month in the presence of the newly appointed President Sali Berisha.

Cabinet 
The Meksi government at the beginning of its term had a structure with 23 positions, where in addition to the prime minister, there were also 2 deputy prime ministers, who also held ministerial posts, a Secretary General of the Council of Ministers, 16 ministers and 3 committee chairmen. The Republican Party left the coalition on 4 December 1994.

Notes

References

G54
1992 establishments in Albania
Ministries established in 1992
Cabinets established in 1992